A History of Christianity is a six-part British television series originally broadcast on BBC Four in 2009. The series was presented by the English ecclesiastical historian Diarmaid MacCulloch, Professor of the History of the Church at the University of Oxford.

Overview
The aim of the BBC network was to produce "a new 'landmark' series which will examine the origins of Christianity and the relevance of the faith in the modern world". Presented by the English ecclesiastical historian Diarmaid MacCulloch, Professor of the History of the Church at the University of Oxford, the series considers the historical development of the Christian religion since its inception in the 1st century to the contemporary era, and its four main forms: Eastern Orthodoxy, Oriental Christianity, Roman Catholicism, and Protestantism.

Episodes

Merchandising
A book written by Diarmaid MacCulloch, published in September 2009 and covering the same topic, is available:

The series was released on DVD on 1 February 2010 with the title A History of Christianity.

References

External links
 
 
 Book Review at The Guardian

2000s British documentary television series
2009 British television series debuts
2009 British television series endings
BBC television documentaries about history